Stijn Streuvels (3 October 1871, Heule, Kortrijk - 15 August 1969, Ingooigem, Anzegem), born Franciscus (Frank) Petrus Maria Lateur, was a Flemish Belgian writer.

Biography
He started writing at a very young age. He was inspired by his uncle, the celebrated poet  Guido Gezelle. Until 1905 he worked as a baker at Avelghem, a village near Kortrijk. Initially his work was published in an insignificant magazine, De jonge Vlaming (The young Fleming). Soon he was discovered by the editors of a new magazine, Van Nu en Straks (From Now and Soon). After their first encounter, Emmanuel de Bom became his mentor and advised him to publish his work in book form. 

In 1905 he married Alida Staelens. They had 4 children: Paula (1906), Paul (1909), Dina (1916) and Isa (1922). In 1980 their house became a museum dedicated to Streuvels.

Streuvels work usually deals with the rural life of poor farmers in Flanders. De Teleurgang van de Waterhoek was made into a film titled Mira. Also De vlaschaard (twice) and De blijde dag were filmed. 

In 1937 and 1938 Streuvels garnered the majority of the Nobel Committee votes for his receiving the literature Nobel Prize, but each time the Academy awarded the prize to someone else: in 1937 he had to give way to Roger Martin du Gard and in 1938 to a new discovery, Pearl Buck. He became doctor honoris causa at the University of Leuven, the University of Münster and the University of Pretoria.

Published work 

 Lenteleven (1899) - containing  and Het einde
 Zomerland (1900) - containing Groeikracht, Zomerland, Meimorgen and Het woud
 Zonnetij (1900) - containing De oogst, In 't water, Zomerzondag and Avondrust
 Doodendans (1901) - containing Doodendans, Jongenstijd (in later editions : Kindertijd), In de wijde wereld, Een speeldag, In de weide, Noorsche liederen, Honden and Doodendans 2
 De oogst (1901) - from Zonnetij
 Langs de wegen (1902) - The book Streuvels himself loved the most
 Dagen (1902) - containing De kalfkoe, Naar buiten, Sint-Jan, Sint-Josef, Vrede and Verovering
 Vertellingen van Tolstoï (1902) - 13 narrations of Tolstoy, translated from German
 Minnehandel (1903) - containing Joel, Maagdekensminne,  and 
 Geluk in 't huishouden (1903) - Book of Tolstoy, translated from German
 Soldatenbloed (1904) - Dramatic play
 Dorpsgeheimen I (1904) - containing De lawine, Bertken en de moordenaars alle twaalf (in later editions : Een beroerde maandag) and Jantje Verdure
 Dorpsgeheimen II (1904) - containing Kinderzieltje,  and Op het kasteel
 Openlucht (1905) - containing Zonder dak, Grootmoederken, Een nieuw hoedje, Het duivelstuig and Jeugd
 Stille avonden (1905) - containing Een lustige begraving, Horieneke, Zomerdagen op het vlakke land, Zonneblommen and Ingoyghem
 Grootmoederken (1905) - from Openlucht
 Het uitzicht der dingen (1906) - containing De kwade dagen, De veeprijskamp and De ommegang
 Reinaert de Vos (1907)
 De vlaschaard (1907)
 Twee vertellingen van Tolstoï (1908)
 Tieghem : Het Vlaamse lustoord (1908) - containing De Streek, Sint Aernout, Het oude Tieghem, Het Lustoord and Eene wandeling
 Najaar I (1909) - containing Najaar, De blijde dag (Najaar was later included in Najaar II; from then on Najaar I became De blijde dag)
 Najaar II (1909) - containing De boomen, Jacht, De aanslag (After inclusion of Najaar I, Najaar II Became Najaar)
 Reinaert de Vos voor de Vierschaar van Koning Nobel de leeuw (1909)
Reinaert de Vos (1910) - Short version of the 1907 edition
 Björnson, Kleine verhalen (1910) - 8 stories of Bjørnstjerne Bjørnson translated from Norwegian
 Vertelsel van Gokkel en Hinkel (1910) - A story of Clemens Brentano translated from German
 De Mourlons (1910) - A book of F. Bouché translated from French
 Het kerstekind (1911)
 Björnstjerne Björnson, Het Bruidslied (1911) - Translated from Norwegian
 Over vrouwe Courtmans (1911) - Text of a lecture
 Het glorierijke licht (1912)
 Morgenstond (1912)
 De werkman (1913) - Later included in Werkmenschen
  (1913)
 Een beroerde maandag (1913) - containing Een beroerde maandag and De lawine (from Dorpsgeheimen I)
 Dorpslucht in 2 delen (1914)
 Mijn rijwiel (1915) - containing Mijn rijwiel , Hoe men schrijver wordt
 In oorlogstijd (1915–1916) - containing Augustus 1914, September 1914, October 1914, November 1914, December 1914-I and December 1914-Slot
 De aanslag (1917) from Najaar II
 Charles de Coster's Vlaamsche vertelsels (1918) - translated from French - containing De mannen van Smeerop, Blanca, Clara en Candida, Heere Halewijn and Smedje Smee
 Sint-Jan (1919) - from Dagen
 De boomen (1919) - from Najaar II
 Björnson, Een vrolijke knaap (1919) - from Kleine verhalen
 Genoveva van Brabant Deel I (1919)
 Genoveva van Brabant Deel II (1920)
 Reinaert de Vos (1921)
 De blijde dag (1921) see Najaar I
  (1921) - short version of the work from 1919
 Prutske (1922)
 Grootmoedertje (1922) - Play version of Grootmoederken from Openlucht
 Vertelsels van 't jaar nul (1922) - containing 29 short stories
 Land en leven in Vlaanderen (1923) - containing Het uitzicht, 
 Herinneringen uit het verleden (1924) - containing Onze streek, Damme, Veurn-Ambacht, Volkslectuur (= edited and enhanced version of Over vrouwe Courtmans), Schoonheid, De schoonste deugd, Kinderlectuur, Mijn schooltijd, Het lied van den weemoed, Mijn loopbaan op de planken, Voor den oorlog, Mijn fiets in oorlogstijd, Na den oorlog, Na vijf en twintig jaren
 Tristan en Isolde (1924) - Based on the old folk book
 Op de Vlaamsche binnenwateren (1925) - containing  't Haantje, Dinsdag, Woensdag, Donderdag, Vrijdag, Zaterdag, Zondag
 Waarom ik Vlaanderen liefheb (1926) - original by G. Blachon translated from French
 Werkmenschen (1926) - containing De werkman (separately published in 1913), Kerstmis in niemandsland, Het leven en de dood in den ast
 De teleurgang van den Waterhoek (1927)
 De drie Koningen aan de kust (1927)
 De tijd der kollebloemen (1927) - original by D.-J. D'Orbaix translated from French
 Levenswijsheid uit China (1928) - translated from German
 Vader en dochter (1928) - Correspondence of Tolstoy with his daughter Marie translated from German
 Reinaert de Vos fragment (1928)
 Kerstwake (1928)
 Kerstvertelsel (1929) - In 1938 published as De vreemde verteller
 Over Genoveva van Brabant (1929) - Text of a lecture
 Alma met de vlassen haren (1931)
 De oude wiking (1931)
 Dr. Lauwers schriften (1931) - Text of a lecture
 Drie Russische novellen (1932)
 De rampzalige kaproen (1933) - Rewriting of a medieval rural novel of Wernher de Tuinder
  (1933) - containing 18 stories
 Sagen uit het hooge noorden (1934) - containing 38 tales from Denmark, Sweden and Iceland
 Zeelieden en zeevisscherij (1934) - Edited from French book of René de Pauw: Gens de mer et pêche maritime
 Vijf kerstvertellingen (1934) - Translated from French work of Camille Melloy
 Prutske's vertelselboek (1935) - containing 9 stories
 Levensbloesem (1937)
 Paradijssprookjes (1938) - From original of Max Mell.
 De terechtstelling van een onschuldige (1940)
 De maanden (1941) - Title in The Netherlands: Een gang door het jaar
 De grauwe ruiter (1942) - original by Herbert von Hoerner translated from German
 Smedje Smee (1942) - From Vlaamsche vertelsels of Ch. de Coster
 Heule (1942)
 Jantje Verdure (1943) - from Dorpsgeheimen I
 Het leven en de dood in den ast (1944) - from Werkmenschen
 Jeugd (1946) - from Openlucht
 Avelghem (1946)
 Beroering over het dorp (1948) - Short reworked version of Dorpslucht
 Ingoyghem (1951) - Period 1904-1914
 Ingoyghem II (1957) - Periode 1914-1940
 Ingooigem (1980) - containing Ingoyghem and Ingoyghem II
 Kroniek van de familie Gezelle (1960)
 Hugo Verriest (1964) - Monography
 In levenden lijve (1966) - Reworkings of some texts from Heule, Avelghem, Ingoyghem and Ingoyghem II, Kroniek van de familie Gezelle and Herinneringen uit het verleden
  (1970) - from Lenteleven
 Het zinnespel van droom en dood (1971) - play version of Het leven en de dood in den ast
 Hoe ik Brugge gezien en beleefd heb (1971)
 Onze streek (1972) - part of Herinneringen uit het verleden

Awarded prizes 
 Prize of Dutch Literature 1906 for his work over the period 1900-1904
 Prize of Dutch Literature 1911 for his work over the period 1905-1909
 State Prize for Literature 1935
 Prize Scriptores Catholici 1950
 Prijs der Nederlandse Letteren 1962 for his entire life work

See also
 Flemish literature

Sources 
 Stijn Streuvels

References

External links 

 
 

1871 births
1969 deaths
19th-century Belgian writers
20th-century Belgian writers
20th-century dramatists and playwrights
Flemish writers
Translators from French
Translators from German
Translators from Norwegian
Translators from Russian
Translators of Leo Tolstoy
Prijs der Nederlandse Letteren winners
People from Anzegem
Belgian male writers